The Blue Planet Prize recognises outstanding efforts in scientific research or applications of science that contribute to solving global environmental problems. The prize was created by the Asahi Glass Foundation in 1992, the year of the Rio Earth Summit, and since then the foundation has awarded the prize to two winners every year. In 2012, twenty of the Blue Planet Prize winners collaborated on a joint paper that was launched at the UN Environment Programme's Governing Council meeting in Nairobi on 20 February.

List of laureates
 1992 Dr. Syukuro Manabe and the International Institute for Environment and Development
 1993 Dr Charles D. Keeling and IUCN-The World Conservation Union
 1994 Prof. Dr. Eugen Seibold and Mr. Lester R. Brown 
 1995 Mr. Maurice F. Strong and Dr. Bert Bolin
 1996 Dr. Wallace S. Broecker and M.S. Swaminathan Research Foundation
 1997 Dr. James E. Lovelock  and Conservation International
 1998 Prof. Mikhail I. Budyko and Mr. David R. Brower
 1999 Dr. Paul R. Ehrlich and Prof. Qu Geping
 2000 Dr. Theo Colborn and Dr. Karl-Henrik Robèrt
 2001 Lord (Robert) May of Oxford and Dr. Norman Myers
 2002 Professor Harold A. Mooney and Prof. J. Gustave Speth
 2003 Dr. Gene E. Likens / Dr. F. Herbert Bormann and Dr. Vo Quy
 2004 Dr. Susan Solomon and Dr. Gro Harlem Brundtland
 2005 Prof. Sir Nicholas Shackleton and Dr. Gordon Hisashi Sato
 2006 Dr. Akira Miyawaki and Dr. Emil Salim 
 2007 Professor Joseph Sax and Dr. Amory B. Lovins
 2008 Dr. Claude Lorius and Professor José Goldemberg
 2009 Professor Hirofumi Uzawa and Lord (Nicholas) Stern of Brentford
 2010 Dr. James Hansen and Dr. Robert Watson
 2011 Dr. Jane Lubchenco and Barefoot College
 2012 Professor William E. Rees / Dr. Mathis Wackernagel and Dr. Thomas E. Lovejoy
 2013 Dr. Taroh Matsuno and Dr. Daniel Sperling
 2014 Prof. Herman Daly and Prof. Daniel H. Janzen / Instituto Nacional de Biodiversidad (INBio)
 2015 Professor Sir Partha Dasgupta FBA FRS and Professor Jeffrey D. Sachs
 2016 Mr. Pavan Sukhdev and Prof. Markus Borner
 2017 Prof. Hans Joachim Schellnhuber and Prof. Gretchen C. Daily
 2018 Prof. Brian Walker and Prof. Malin Falkenmark
 2019 Prof. Eric Lambin and Prof. Jared Diamond
 2020 Prof. David Tilman and Dr. Simon Stuart
 2021 Prof. Veerabhadran Ramanathan and Prof. Mohan Munasinghe
 2022 His Majesty Jigme Singye Wangchuck, the Fourth King of Bhutan and Prof. Stephen Carpenter

See also

 List of environmental awards

References

External links 
 The Asahi Glass Foundation
 Blue Planet Prize Laureates Statement: Planetary Prosperity Means Zero Carbon // Global Footprint Network site, 31 October 2017 

Environmental awards
Japanese science and technology awards